Rosalyn D. Henderson-Myers is an attorney and an American politician. She is a member of the South Carolina House of Representatives from the 31st District, serving since 2017. She is a member of the Democratic party.

Henderson-Myers serves on the House Judiciary Committee. In 2022, she was on the 12-member House ad hoc committee that held public hearings on House Bill 5399 that banned abortions. She serves as Secretary of the South Carolina Legislative Black Caucus.

References

Living people
Democratic Party members of the South Carolina House of Representatives
21st-century American politicians
African-American people in South Carolina politics
University of South Carolina alumni
Tulane University alumni
Year of birth missing (living people)
21st-century African-American politicians

Women state legislators in South Carolina